The 2017–18 Sydney FC season was the club's 13th season since its establishment in 2004. The club participated in the A-League for the 13th time, the FFA Cup for the fourth time, as well as the AFC Champions League for the fourth time.

Players

Squad information

From youth squad

Transfers in

Transfers out

Contract extensions

Technical staff

Statistics

Squad statistics

|-
|colspan="24"|Players no longer at the club:

Preseason and friendlies

Competitions

Overall

A-League

League table

Results summary

Results by round

Matches

Finals series

FFA Cup

AFC Champions League

Results summary

Results by stage

Group stage

End-of-season awards
On 19 May, 2018, Sydney FC hosted their annual Sky Blue Ball and presented eight awards on the night.

References

Notes

External links
 Official Website

Sydney FC
Sydney FC seasons